Behen Hogi Teri is a 2017 Indian Hindi-language romantic comedy film starring Rajkummar Rao and Shruti Haasan. This film was scheduled for a worldwide release on 26 May 2017, but release was pushed back to 9 June 2017.

Plot 

In the city of Lucknow, Gattu (Rajkummar Rao), a jobless UPSC aspirant has fallen in love with Binny (Shruti Haasan), a girl who lives in his neighbourhood and is well aware of Gattu'''s feelings for her but doesn't pay much attention to him because she finds him to be a coward. Gattu's desire for a marital bond with Binny puts him in a situation where he has to not just face off with a family of criminals who want to make Binny their Daughter-in-Law at any cost, but also gather the courage to convince his own parents and neighbours that all boys and girls living in the same neighbourhood are not brothers and sisters.

 Cast 

 Rajkummar Rao as Shiv Nautiyal aka Gattu
 Shruti Haasan as Binny Arora
 Gautam Gulati as Rahul Saluja
 Herry Tangri as Bhura Bhati, Gattu's Best Friend
 Darshan Jariwala as Hemchander Nautiyal, Gattu's Father
 Natasha Rastogi as Mrs. Nautiyal, Gattu's Mother
 Ninad Kamat as Jaydev Arora, Binny's Elder Brother
 Gulshan Grover as Dhappi Pehalwaan, Bhura's Father
 Ranjeet as Gajender Pehalwaan, Bhura's Taau
 Reena Aggarwal as Ritu, Binny's sister
 Simona as Daadi, Binny's Grandmother
 Bhavya Datta as Ajju, Binny's Younger Brother

 Ritu Gaur as Rahul's Mom

Durgesh Kumar as Inspector

 Soundtrack 

The soundtrack of Behen Hogi Teri'' consists seven songs composed by Yash Narvekar, Amjad Nadeem, JAM8, Jaidev Kumar, R. D. Burman & Rishi Rich.

Critical reception 
Rajeev Masand of News18 gave the film two stars out of five; he praised Rao's performance but criticised the weak screenplay: "Where the film slips up is in its writing. The plot, which starts off on a curious note becomes especially convoluted in its second hour". Sweta Kausal of Hindustan Times gave the film a rating of 2 out of 5 and said that, "Behen Hogi Teri suffers from a poorly conceived plot that fails to offer the fun expected of a story of its kind. The only enjoyable parts of the movie are the dialogues and the acting of Rajkummar." Saibal Chatterjee of NDTV found the writing of the film and Shruti Haasan's acting performance to be extremely weak and concluded his review by saying that, "Watch Behen Hogi Teri only if you think a one-man show is good enough to offset the drudgery of a two-hour trudge through a maze of inanities." Saibal gave the film a rating of 2 out of 5.

Shubhra Gupta of The Indian Express gave the film a rating of 1.5 out of 5 and said that, "The only element worth looking at in this film, apart from the dependable Kamat, is the rock-solid Rao. If he was given a better co-star than the strictly one-note Haasan, this might have turned out to be a better film." Nihit Bhave of The Times of India gave the film a rating of 2.5 out of 5 and said that, "The plot is juvenile to say the least" and "the only reason to smile at the movie is Rajkummar Rao". Namrata Joshi of The Hindu said that, "The possibility of an interesting film gets lost in an overcooked script shorn of any remarkable situations and humour." Rachit Gupta of Filmfare gave the film a rating of 2.5. out of 5 and said that, "While the premise of Behen Hogi Teri holds promise, the film is written with very little imagination. It plays out in a terribly familiar fashion. Its like you’ve watched this film's formula 10000 times before."

References

External links 
 

2017 films
Indian romantic comedy films
2010s Hindi-language films
Films scored by Jaidev Kumar
Films scored by Yash Narvekar
Films scored by JAM8
Films scored by Amjad Nadeem
Films scored by Rishi Rich
Films scored by R. D. Burman
Films set in Mumbai
Films shot in Lucknow